The New Brunswick Training School was a youth detention centre in Kingsclear, New Brunswick, Canada, about  west of Fredericton.

Opened in the 1940s, it was the provincial male youth detention centre. It closed in 1998 following an inquiry into abuse there.

It was a wing of the Kingsclear Reformatory, a minimum security facility located nearby, which closed in 2000.

Karl Toft was one of the guards at Kingsclear and was convicted of committing 34 sex crimes against inmates between the mid 1960s and the mid 1980s. He has admitted to raping over 200 boys in a 35—year period. Other guards have been alleged to have also raped boys at Kingsclear.

References

External links

1940s establishments in New Brunswick
1990s disestablishments in New Brunswick
Buildings and structures in York County, New Brunswick
Child sexual abuse in Canada
Defunct prisons in Canada
New Brunswick political scandals
Prisons in New Brunswick
Youth detention centres in Canada
Violence against men in North America